The Invisible Man (also shortened to "The I-Man" in Season 2) is a Sci-Fi American television series starring Vincent Ventresca, Paul Ben-Victor, Eddie Jones, Shannon Kenny and Michael McCafferty. It aired for two seasons from June 9, 2000 to February 1, 2002 before being cancelled due to cost issues and internal arguments between the Sci Fi Channel and its then-parent company, USA Networks. The show's first season ran concurrently in first-run syndication as well as on Sci-Fi.

The series uses its science fiction and action elements to explore a variety of themes such as freedom of choice, determinism, and state bureaucracy.

Plot
The Invisible Man is both an action show and a comedy with buddy cop elements.

The plot revolves around Darien Fawkes (Ventresca), a thief facing life imprisonment who is recruited by a spy agency that is constantly short on funds, and given the power of invisibility via implantation of a special "Quicksilver gland" in his head. The gland allows Fawkes to secrete a light-bending substance called "Quicksilver" from his pores and follicles. The substance quickly coats his skin, hair, nails, clothes, and whatever he is carrying, and renders him invisible. He can consciously release the Quicksilver, which then flakes off and disintegrates. However, the Quicksilver gland was sabotaged at its creation by scientist Arnaud DeFehrn to release a neurotoxin that accumulates in the bloodstream and causes intense pain, followed by antisocial behavior and psychosis. The host requires regular doses of "counteragent" to keep him sane and healthy, which is controlled by the government agency. 

Episodes were generally of two types. Many centered on cases given to Fawkes and Hobbes by The Agency. These usually dealt with assassinations or government experiments that had run amok. During the first season, The Agency was given a nemesis agency called Chrysalis which was often behind the week's conspiracy.

Alternatively, episodes dealt with Fawkes' quest to have the gland removed from his head and/or to reduce his dependency on the counteragent. His unorthodox methods included reviving the mind of his dead brother and periodically contacting Arnaud DeFehrn, one of the gland's creators, though these encounters usually ended with one of the two in pain. The agency considered the gland too great an asset to remove so Fawkes' personal quest usually brought him in direct conflict with those in power.

Episodes usually begin with a voice-over by Fawkes who would open with a famous quote and comment about what he was currently thinking. The voice over would reemerge at the end of the episode to sum up Fawkes' opinion on the mission or allow him to voice lingering questions.

At the conclusion of the series, Fawkes had been given a new counteragent that permanently cured him of quicksilver madness — his body having become gradually immune to the standard counteragent — but after briefly returning to his old thieving career and another stint at the FBI, he returned to the Agency to continue fighting Chrysalis.

Characters
The following is a list of characters featured in the American science fiction series The Invisible Man. This list may not list characters that have only made guest appearances.

Main characters
 Darien Fawkes (Vincent Ventresca)
Darien Fawkes is a former career criminal and catburglar, who received multiple misdemeanor convictions and two felony convictions before he was thirty. Darien is described as having an "above-average intellect", and capable of being very deceptive. He and his brother Kevin were raised on a farm by their aunt and uncle after their mother died and their father left them (it is later learned that their father was a sniper for the government and after his cover was blown, he left his family in order to protect them). While Kevin became a scientist, Darien began a career as a thief while still in his teens. After being caught because he stopped to give CPR to a heart-attack victim, he was sentenced to life in prison without possibility of parole under California's three strikes law. This was where his older brother, Kevin, stepped in.

Kevin was a research scientist who had been working on a top-secret project. He cut a deal with his bosses to get Darien out of prison in exchange for using him as a test subject. When Darien agreed, he was then implanted with the Quicksilver gland, but Kevin's rush to remove Darien from prison meant that he implanted the gland before devising a way to remove it without killing the recipient. One of the other scientists, Arnaud DeFehrn, was actually a terrorist that had infiltrated the project, and led an attack on the research facility that caused Kevin's death and the loss of most of the project research. Darien escaped but was unwillingly drafted into The Agency, who had funded the project.

In exchange for the counteragent, he needed to stay sane, Darien agreed, albeit reluctantly, to be an agent under their employment. Upon working with The Agency, Darien develops an affinity for his co-workers and opts to continue working there even after his dependency on counteragent is cured by Claire.

He has high morals for a career criminal – he could have easily escaped after his final break-in except he surprised the elderly owner into a heart attack, and stayed behind to perform CPR (unfortunately, the officers who caught him and the elderly man himself thought he was molesting the latter). He is a highly talented thief with expert-level breaking and entering skills, learned from his many incarcerations, and finds these skills quite useful in his new career as an espionage agent. His trademark expression is "Oh, crap.", usually said when he realizes he just got himself in trouble, although he also has a habit of quoting various other sources at least once in each episode (albeit in the form of a voiceover).

On one occasion, Darien was briefly possessed by the personality of Simon Cole, the previous owner of the gland, after Cole's residual RNA took over his body thanks to the imprint of his personality left in the gland, causing Darien to see Cole when he turned his eyes invisible and briefly act as him. Darien later attempted to use this 'quirk' of the gland to transplant his brother's RNA into his mind so that Kevin could work out a way to remove the gland or fix the quicksilver deficiency, but Kevin was unable to cure the madness and chose not to arrange for the gland to be removed as he felt it made Darien a better person.

Due to the gland, Darien has various powers beyond being able to simply turn invisible; he can turn his eyes invisible and see in infrared, his body temperature lowers to a point where he can cool drinks while invisible and escape heat-seeking weapons, he can turn others invisible so long as he remains in contact with them, and he can even turn parts of his body invisible while leaving the rest of him fully visible (Allowing him to, for example, pretend to be a double-amputee to infiltrate a hospital, or turn his head invisible to give the impression that he has killed himself to catch enemies off-guard).

Robert Albert Hobbes (Paul Ben-Victor)
Robert "Bobby" Hobbes is one of the agents working for the Agency, easily the most experienced and thus their most highly capable asset in the field, right next to Darien's invisibility powers. He is given Darien as a partner when Darien joins the Agency. At the start of the series, Hobbes has been at the Agency for several years, as The Official hired him when his quirks and mild manic depression had gotten him tossed out of every other government intelligence agency. Despite the Agency being his last chance at government work, Hobbes feels underappreciated there, receiving very little pay and being sent on mostly unfavorable missions. Despite his mistreatment at The Agency, he displays a strong loyalty towards it as displayed by his unwillingness to accept a position at the FBI for a higher salary.

His relationship with Darien begins somewhat badly, with Darien being new to undercover missions and frequently blowing their cover while nevertheless earning far more than Hobbes, but they eventually become close friends, displaying a willingness to sacrifice their lives for each other on several occasions. They often banter with each other, much to the annoyance of those around them. Hobbes seems to enjoy using guns, constantly carrying at least one on his person at all times. He frequently pulls it out and threatens people with it, often referring to it as his "insurance policy". He frequently refers to himself in the third person, which is often mistaken for arrogance. He is a former marine who served in Operation: Desert Storm, and in addition to his Marine Corps hand-to-hand combat training, is also an expert in the Korean martial art Hapkido, although in one episode he describes his skill as a "Grand Master of Wu Shu", trained by the CIA. In more than one episode, Hobbes has disarmed and knocked out as many as three armed combatants. Hobbes displays signs of extreme, sometimes comical paranoia in most cases, acting as if the world is out to get him. He frequently runs background checks on people he's suspicious of, and is not above stalking people to see if they are up to anything. Being trained by the FBI and the CIA, he is excellent at spying and information gathering, both of which only serve to make his paranoia worse.

Charles Borden a.k.a. The Official (Eddie Jones)
Charles "Charlie" Borden is the long-time head of The Agency. Most of his background is unknown, due to Borden's refusal to divulge information about himself to his agents (for instance, Darien first learns Borden's name upon hearing two U.S. Marshals place Borden under arrest). He has been the head of the Agency for an indeterminate time, but it is insinuated from photographic evidence that he has served in this capacity since at least the Kennedy administration. He typically expects his orders to be carried out with no argument from Darien, Hobbes, or Claire, usually dismissing any of their questions or concerns out of hand. The Official is concerned with two things above all else: carrying out the missions he is entrusted with - despite his frustration at the constantly shifting nature of the Agency's funding due to their low budget - and keeping an eye on the Agency's bottom line.

Albert Eberts (Michael McCafferty)
Albert Eberts came to the Agency from the IRS, and serves as both assistant to The Official and the Agency's bookkeeper.  He usually conducts Darien and Hobbes' briefings, frequently going into more detail than The Official deems necessary and being told: "Shut up, Eberts." He is highly skilled in the use of computers and also displays a proficiency in martial arts.

Dr. Claire Keeply a.k.a. the Keeper (Shannon Kenny)
Claire is The Agency's resident medical doctor and researcher, and was a minor researcher on the team that did preliminary work for developing the Quicksilver gland. She is responsible for monitoring Darien's health and compiling data on long-term usage of the gland. She is also the one who mixes and administers the counteragent serum. She does not particularly care for Darien at first, possibly because he reminds her of Kevin (who she had been romantically involved with before his death) although eventually she and Darien become friends; Claire even risks her career to cure Darien permanently of Quicksilver Madness. There are hints of romantic tension between her and Hobbes.

Alex Monroe (Brandy Ledford, season two)
Alex Monroe is an addition to the cast in the show's second season. She is a federal agent working for the Agency and is regarded as one of the finest agents overall. In addition to her skills as a deep cover operative, she is an avid martial artist and amateur profiler, skills that she has used to build a strong network of friends and spared enemies who frequently supplement her resources at the Agency with top-of-the-line equipment. She has top security clearance and is the sole agent that has her own office in the Agency. In doing so, she initially earns the ire of Bobby Hobbes, who covets the comparatively lavish budget and equipment that she enjoys. This eventually expands into a full blown rivalry between the two, though it later becomes more friendly as their respect grows. Before the end of the series, she fully trusts Hobbes as a reliable back up in any mission, particularly after Hobbes demonstrates his proficiency in next-generation surveillance equipment and shows superior marksmanship. She has a personal vendetta against a group called "Chrysalis", who used her as a surrogate mother to produce a genetically engineered son. After birth, they took her son, and she has been looking for the group ever since. She eventually finds the baby but then decides to let his biological mother (Jarod Stark's wife Eleanor, the former being also the baby's biological father) keep it, sensing her feelings about him to be genuine and her wishing to defect from Chrysalis (though, unbeknown to the Agency, the latter is untrue). Even after this, Alex decides to stay with the Agency.

Minor characters
 Dr. Arnaud DeFöhn (Joel Bissonnette)
 Terrorist and primary antagonist of Darien Fawkes, being responsible for implanting him with the Quicksilver madness – a defect he included in the gland to give him control over all invisible men – and killing his brother. Later on, he developed his own version of the gland without the defect of quicksilver madness, but this version was improperly implanted and rendered him permanently invisible, forcing him to wear a lifelike mask cloned from his own tissue to pass for normal. He is approached by Stark who agrees to have the gland removed in exchange for him helping them use the gland for Chrysalis's own purpose, but eventually escapes. He appears in 9 episodes.

 Jarod Stark (Spencer Garrett)
 The charismatic leader of a branch of the mysterious Chrysalis organization.

 Allianora (Idalis DeLeón, season one)
 One of Chrysalis' top agents. Through bio-modification she has gained the ability to breathe water and regurgitate it under pressure, making her capable of drowning people with a kiss. She is killed by Stark in the season one finale after she saves Darien from drowning and in the process betrays Chrysalis. It is implied she received the modifications to save her life and there is much romantic tension between her and Darien, culminating in her betraying Chrysalis to help him.

 Dr. Kevin Fawkes (David Burke)
 Darien's brother and the developer of the Quicksilver gland, he personally implanted the gland into his brother's brain. He is murdered by Arnaud DeFöhn, but appeared in a later episode as part of a plot by Arnaud to trick Darien into thinking he'd survived. Later on, Kevin's memory RNA was injected into the gland – essentially resurrecting him in Darien's body – in the hope that he would be able to figure out a way to remove it, but he declined, believing that the gland made Darien a better person. Despite their different lifestyles, the two appeared to be fairly close, with Kevin stating that he selected Darien as the test subject for the gland because he didn't trust anyone else with it.

 Dr. Thomas Walker/Augustin Gaither (Armin Shimerman)
 Formerly a (rather amoral) scientist working for the fictional Secret Weapons Research Bureau, the same government facility that helped Kevin Fawkes develop the Quicksilver gland. He volunteered as a test subject for one of his own projects, only to see it fail. The failure rendered him "insensate", meaning he was robbed of his senses – save for his sense of touch on the tips of two fingers. It also induced a psychotic break; he forgot his previous life as a practitioner of human experimentation and instead constructed an identity as "Tommy Walker" (after the protagonist of The Who's album Tommy, a blind deaf mute) a relatively harmless technician who was used as a test subject as punishment for arguing with Gaither. With his remaining sense he was able to construct what he refers as a sensor array strapped onto his chest that enables two of his dysfunctional senses – hearing and vision – to function in a crude but useful manner, allowing him to perceive the world as "lights and shadows", and hear sounds as "loud and soft".

David Burke (Kevin Fawkes) and Armin Shimerman (Thomas Walker) also starred together in the short-lived The Tick live action series.

The Agency
The Agency is a U.S. government espionage and special operations agency, but one that is extremely secretive – so much that it doesn't have a proper name. Charlie Borden (known as "The Official"), the director of The Agency, explained that the organization takes on cases that the other agencies "can't, won't, or don't". References in the show point to the Agency as being a "Cold War relic".

The most curious characteristic of The Agency is how it keeps being "absorbed" by Federal Departments that are completely unrelated to intelligence. During the first season, The Agency was a division of the semi-fictional federal "Department of Fish and Game" (i.e. the Fish and Wildlife Service). In the pilot episode, it was explained this was due to the fact that at the time the Department of Defense was having budget cuts while the DFG had a surplus of money.

During the second season, The Agency changed departments several times, having been absorbed by the Bureau of Indian Affairs, the Department of Health and Human Services, and (very briefly) the United States Postal Service before settling in the semi-fictional Bureau of Weights and Measures. All of this led to a running gag in which Hobbes and Fawkes are never taken seriously as federal agents, since their identifications always includes their unassuming department name.

Invisibility concept
The series' concept of invisibility is explained through the existence of "Quicksilver", a silver-colored synthetic hormone presumably created by Kevin Fawkes and his team of scientists and put inside an artificial gland through the "Project Quicksilver" under the codename of Project QS-9000. When secreted, the substance is initially liquid, but slowly solidifies over the surface of objects "like Saran wrap" (as explained by Kevin), at which point it "bends" light that would normally reflect in the covered surface before refocusing it behind the object. As a result, the object becomes invisible to the naked eye in a matter of seconds.

After the gland's implantation on Darien's brain, its secretion can be jumpstarted by the acceleration of his heart rate and the excretion of adrenaline, triggered by the sensation of fear or tension, although he eventually learns how to control its flow and to consciously secrete it through intense body training. As Quicksilver does not reflect light, it does not absorb it either; this drops the covered surface's temperature "below freezing;" however, it serves to insulate Darien against the extreme cold or heat. It is also stated that Darien can suffer from "premature visibility" if he gets distracted or loses focus on remaining invisible, and extreme adrenaline surges can affect his control over the gland (in one instance, for example, Darien had to abstain from engaging in sexual activity as his body would automatically secrete Quicksilver during the adrenaline surge). When in control of the process, Darien has demonstrated the ability to turn only parts of his body invisible, such as quicksilvering his eyes so that he can see in the infrared spectrum, turning his head invisible to lure his enemies into close range by making it appear as though he has shot himself, or concealing his arms or legs so that he could pass as a handicapped person for investigative purposes.

In addition, Darien acquires other invisibility properties such as "quicksilvering" other objects and even persons (like he does to Hobbes in "Cat & Mouse"). He is also able to "see" objects or persons rendered invisible (as shown in "Money For Nothing, Part 2", when he can see Arnaud covered with Quicksilver). This property is explained by the fact that Quicksilver can absorb other types of radiation, such as infrared and ultraviolet, despite not reflecting pure light itself (which explains why quicksilvered persons can be detected on thermal imaging sensors or lenses). When he was temporarily blinded by an assassin's blindness-inducing weapon, Darien was not only able to limit the damage by automatically turning invisible when the weapon hit his eyes - thus giving his vision a chance to heal where others exposed to the weapon were permanently blinded.

Quicksilver Madness
The main drawback of the Quicksilver gland is the periodic "Quicksilver Madness": a flaw engineered by scientist Arnaud DeFöhn causes the gland to leak Quicksilver into the brain of the host, leading to a breakdown of higher cortical function, initially causing a lack of inhibition. The eyes become bloodshot and short bursts of pain result, but the host maintains most control over his behavior. However, as the situation progresses, the pain becomes more severe until the host enters the "madness", at which point the pain ceases, but the host begins to exhibit violent behaviour accompanied by apparently vastly increased physical strength, pain tolerance, and possibly even resistance to injury, as his "darker impulses" are released. The whites of the eyes become completely red at this stage.

In the two-part episode "Money for Nothing", Darien has his counteragent confiscated by The Official as a way to force him into handing over cash he stole from DeFöhn's casino. This results in Darien entering a higher stage of Madness called "Stage 5" (implying that the Quicksilver Madness has at least four earlier stages). In this stage, the eyes become silver due to Quicksilver leaking through the host's lacrimal ducts. This stage leads to a complete loss of inhibitions, as well as psychotic behaviour, euphoria and megalomania, although the host seems to regain ability to plan and focus, which is lost at the lower stages. This stage is significantly more difficult to reverse, requiring specialized counteragent. It is stated that if Stage 5 Quicksilver Madness is not reversed within approximately 12 hours, its effects will probably become irreversible.

To prevent Darien from going into Quicksilver Madness, his Quicksilver levels are "monitored" by a tattoo of a snake devouring its own tail divided into segments, placed on his arm by Claire. When Darien has a fresh supply of counteragent, the snake is completely green, but it becomes progressively red as the Quicksilver saturates Darien's body (spreading faster when Darien turns invisible), allowing the Agency to keep track of his Quicksilver levels. Over time, Darien's body became increasingly resistant to the counteragent, but Claire was eventually able to discover a formula that Arnaud had developed which permanently cured Darien of the Madness by the end of the series.

On one occasion, Claire was able to turn the gland off with a special injection, thus preventing quicksilver seeping through Darien's body, but this procedure was of limited effectiveness as prolonged suppression of the quicksilver could have triggered a cerebral hemorrhage and killed Darien.

Episodes

Season 1 (2000–01)

Season 2 (2001–02)

Broadcasters

Home media
The first season of The Invisible Man was released on DVD for Region 2 as a two-part collection in March and April 2003. The Invisible Man – Season One was released as a complete Region 1 DVD set on March 25, 2008. The Region 1 DVD set also includes the first episode from Season 2.

The Region 1 release, however, contains the alternate version of "Money for Nothing, Part II," (where Hobbes attempts to take Darien into custody) instead of the episode that the fans had chosen (where Hobbes joins forces with Darien). No explanation has been issued for this, and may simply be included on the second Invisible Man DVD release, as it was in the release for the UK.

The Region 1 release also features the episodes in widescreen 16/9, unlike the Region 2 one which had the episodes in full screen 4/3.

The second season is not available on DVD.

Streaming
Both seasons of the series are available for streaming on the NBC.com app in cropped 4:3 instead of the original widescreen aspect ratio. The version of "Money for Nothing, Part II" is the episode that the fans chose (where Hobbes joins forces with Darien).

References

External links

 
 
 

2000 American television series debuts
2002 American television series endings
2000s American comic science fiction television series
2000 TV series
Fiction about invisibility
Syfy original programming
Espionage television series
Television series by Universal Television
American action comedy television series